Ildikó Farkasinszky-Bóbis (born 5 September 1945) is a retired Hungarian foil fencer. She competed at the 1968, 1972 and 1976 Olympics and won  three silver and one bronze medals. Her father Gyula Bóbis was an Olympic champion in wrestling.

References

External links
 

1945 births
Living people
Hungarian female foil fencers
Olympic fencers of Hungary
Fencers at the 1968 Summer Olympics
Fencers at the 1972 Summer Olympics
Fencers at the 1976 Summer Olympics
Olympic silver medalists for Hungary
Olympic bronze medalists for Hungary
Olympic medalists in fencing
Martial artists from Budapest
Medalists at the 1968 Summer Olympics
Medalists at the 1972 Summer Olympics
Medalists at the 1976 Summer Olympics
20th-century Hungarian women